The Colgate Raiders will represent Colgate University in the 2009–10 NCAA Division I women's ice hockey season. The Raiders head coach is Scott Wiley. Assisting him are Ryan Stone, and Carly McNaughton.

Offseason
 July 20: Colgate University announced the signing of six student-athletes to join the team as the Class of 2013. The players are three defenders, two forwards and one goaltender.
 Jordan Brickner – 5-8, D, Lake Forest, Ill. (Connecticut Stars)
 Jessica Hootz - 5-9, D, Edmonton, Alta. (Edmonton Thunder)
 Jenna Klynstra - 5-9, F, Edmonton, Alta. (Edmonton Thunder)
 Brittany Phillips - 5-5, F, Lauder, Man. (Westman Wildcats)
 Whitney Routman - 5-8, D, Northbrook, Ill. (Chicago Mission)
 Jocelyn Yokow - 5-4, G, Windsor, Conn. (Connecticut Polar Bears)

Regular season

Standings

Roster

Schedule

Player stats

Skaters

Goaltenders

Postseason

NCAA hockey tournament

Awards and honors
 Katie Stewart, ECAC Player of the Week (Week of February 15, 2010)

References

External links
 Official site

Colgate
Colgate Raiders women's ice hockey seasons